The 1973 Asia Golf Circuit was the 12th season of golf tournaments that comprised the Asia Golf Circuit, formerly known as the Far East Circuit.

Australian Graham Marsh won the circuit overall prize for the second year running.

Schedule
The table below shows the 1973 Asia Golf Circuit schedule. The only scheduling change from 1972 was the Hong Kong tournament moved to an early date.

Final standings
The Asia Golf Circuit standings were based on a points system.

References

Asia Golf Circuit
Asia Golf Circuit